"Bart Star" is the sixth episode of the ninth season of the American animated television series The Simpsons. It originally aired on the Fox network in the United States on November 9, 1997. Written by Donick Cary and directed by Dominic Polcino, the episode guest starred Joe Namath, Roy Firestone, and Mike Judge. The episode sees Homer becoming the coach of a pee-wee football team and practices nepotism with Bart by making him the quarterback, which receives backlash from the whole team, including Bart himself.

The episode was critically well received.

Plot
Following a Health convention held in Springfield, the children of Springfield (including Bart) are deemed to be overweight. To help them stay in shape, their parents enroll them in pee-wee football. The coach, Ned Flanders, helps keep the team undefeated, but Homer heckles him relentlessly. Ned finally snaps and turns the job over to Homer, who then admits that Flanders was doing a good job.

Homer initially acts tough towards Bart, but when he is reminded of how his father Abe was hard on him as a child, he decides to be nicer to Bart. The next day, he decides to cut many players from the team, and replaces star quarterback Nelson with Bart, causing the team to criticize him. Bart is unable to play the position well and causes the team's first loss. While training at night Bart meets Joe Namath, who promises to help him, but soon after Joe's wife fixes the car, which had broken down due to vapor lock, Joe leaves without helping Bart.

Lisa suggests that Bart pretend he is injured to get out of quarterbacking, which he eagerly does, but Homer claims that without Bart the team must forfeit. This causes Bart to become angry and quit the team. The next game, Nelson is made quarterback again and the team wins, but Homer has nobody to celebrate with and becomes lonely. Afterward, Homer finds Bart and persuades him to rejoin the team. The next day, during the championship game, the score is tied when Chief Wiggum comes to arrest Nelson. Bart decides to pretend he is Nelson and the team finally wins the championship.

Production

The episode was written by Donick Cary, who obtained inspiration from an experience in high school he had with a football coach who had a son on the team. Similarly, show runner Mike Scully had been on a soccer team whose coach would give his son special treatment.

George Meyer obtained inspiration for the scene toward the beginning of the episode where Rainier Wolfcastle is taunting the children from an experience he had with Arnold Schwarzenegger. He was following Schwarzenegger during a hike, and overheard him taunting his children. Schwarzenegger's influence was seen in the same scene, as he was appointed to be the chairman of the President's Council on Physical Fitness and Sports, on which he served from 1990 to 1993.

Throughout the episode, Homer is dressed to homage Dallas Cowboys icon Tom Landry, and wears a similar hat. Homer previously bought Landry's hat in previous season episode "You Only Move Twice". The final scene took a long time to write. The writing staff found it difficult to come up with a resolution that would end on positive terms for Bart and Homer, and was originally different when it was read at the writing table.

Casting
Joe Namath, Roy Firestone, and Mike Judge guest-starred in the episode. In a July 28, 1997 interview with USA Today, Mike Scully said that Namath's cameo was "an homage to all those '60s sitcoms where an athlete would drop in on the young kid (in this case, Bart) who's having problems and give him some great advice to help him out and say things like, 'Sure, sports is fun but school is great, too.'" Mike Judge's appearance was a cross-promotion for his animated series King of the Hill, which followed The Simpsons on Fox's Sunday schedule in 1997. Other King of the Hill characters (Hank's niece Luanne, Hank's wife Peggy, Hank's son Bobby, and Hank's friends, Dale Gribble, Bill Dauterive, and Boomhauer) were present for this scene, which depicts them as real characters within the Simpsons'
universe, although none of them spoke. In the USA Today interview, Scully remarked that the King of the Hill characters only had brief cameos since "I don't want to oversell it, because I don't want Mike Judge to think I'm exploiting him. It's just one line." In the same interview, King of the Hill producer and former Simpsons writer Greg Daniels commented that, "In the world of King of the Hill, The Simpsons exists only in that Bobby (the pudgy son) has a Bart doll. They exist as a TV show." Scully added in another July 1997 with the Orlando Sentinel that there was no rivalry between the two shows at the time, stating "we're friends with a lot of people over there. The two shows have helped each other out a lot."

Marv Albert was originally going to play Firestone's part as a sports radio host, but was dropped following sexual assault charges that were made against him around the time the episode was in pre-production. Albert would later appear, however, in the season 20 episode "The Burns and the Bees".

Reception
In its original broadcast, "Bart Star" finished 27th in ratings for the week of November 3–9, 1997, with a Nielsen rating of 10.8, equivalent to approximately 10.6 million viewing households. It was the third highest-rated show on the Fox network that week, following The X-Files and King of the Hill.

Since airing, the episode has received positive reviews from critics. 
The authors of the book I Can't Believe It's a Bigger and Better Updated Unofficial Simpsons Guide, Warren Martyn and Adrian Wood, thought well of the episode, saying, "A fun episode, where you root for Bart and, unusually, Nelson - all the way through. Homer is just too stupid for words, but that's excusable because we finally see Ned Flanders lose it, big time!"

In 2011, Keith Plocek of LA Weeklys Squid Ink blog named the scene in which Homer tries to purchase "beer that has candy floating in it" (which Homer calls skittlebrau) at the Kwik-E-Mart as the fourth best food moment on the show. The director of the episode, Dominic Polcino, greatly enjoyed the episode, and claims that it is his favorite episode that he directed.

References

External links

 
 

The Simpsons (season 9) episodes
1997 American television episodes
American football animation
Television episodes directed by Dominic Polcino